The Valdayka is a river in Valdaysky District of Novgorod Oblast and in Bologovsky District of Tver Oblast in Russia. It is a tributary of Lake Piros and belongs to the basin of the river Msta.

The Valdayka flows over the Valdai Hills and is a part of the waterway from Lake Valdayskoye to Lake Ilmen. The source of the Valdayka is in Lake Uzhin, close to the town of Valday. The river flows north-east to Lake Piros. The Moscow – Saint Petersburg Railway crosses the Valdayka close to the village of Lykoshino. Since the Berezayka flows through the Lake Piros, the Valdayka is considered its tributary.

As many rivers in the Valdai Hills, it is a popular rafting route.

References

Rivers of Novgorod Oblast
Rivers of Tver Oblast